Johannes Cornelis "Hans" Tetzner (9 June 1898 – 17 February 1987) was a Dutch association football defender and medical doctor. He was part of the Dutch team that finished fourth at the 1924 Summer Olympics. Between 1915 and 1926 he played for Be Quick 1887, winning nine Northern Dutch titles and one national title in 1920.

Hans Tetzner had an elder brother Max; they competed alongside both in football and speed skating. Hans also played tennis, once reaching the semifinals of the Dutch national doubles championships. He later became a prominent surgeon and served as a doctor for the football club AFC Ajax and for the 1936 Dutch Olympic cycling team. In the 1960s he was a regular guest at the television show Wie van de Drie?

References

1898 births
1987 deaths
Dutch footballers
Olympic footballers of the Netherlands
Association football forwards
Footballers at the 1924 Summer Olympics
Footballers from Groningen (city)
Netherlands international footballers